Pamela Gail Hensley (born October 3, 1950) is an American actress and author. Her notable acting roles include Princess Ardala on the 1979–1981 television series Buck Rogers in the 25th Century and C.J. Parsons on the 1982–1985 television series Matt Houston. She also appeared in Rollerball and Doc Savage (both 1975) and Double Exposure (1982).

Early life
Hensley was born on October 3, 1950 in Los Angeles. Her father was a veterinarian, and her mother was an actress.

Career
Hensley played Janet Blake during the last season of Marcus Welby, M.D.. This was followed by a half season's work as an investigator on Kingston: Confidential.

She appeared in the role of Princess Ardala in the film Buck Rogers in the 25th Century (originally a television pilot that was released theatrically) before reprising her role several times in the subsequent series. Hensley also portrayed C.J. Parsons during the three-year run of the detective series Matt Houston.

Acting roles
 Matt Houston as C.J. Parsons (69 episodes, 1982–1985)
 The Love Boat (2 episodes, 1984)
 Hotel as Brooke Whitfield (1 episode, 1984)
 Double Exposure (1982) as Sgt. Fontain
 Fantasy Island as Linda Whitney (1 episode, 1982)
 Rooster (1982) (TV) as Bunny Richter
 240-Robert (1981) TV series as Deputy Sandy Harper (3 episodes / second season, 1981)
 Condominium (1980) (TV) as Drusilla Byrne
 The Nude Bomb (1980) as Agent 36
 Buck Rogers in the 25th Century as Princess Ardala (pilot feature and 4 episodes, 1979–1980)
 The Rebels (1979) (TV) as Charlotte Waverly
 B. J. and the Bear as Holly Tremaine (1 episode, 1979)
 Vega$ as Valerie Kemmet (1 episode, 1979)
 Sharks (1978) (TV) as Cynthia Grayland
 Switch as Sandra Summers (2 episodes, 1977)
 The Six Million Dollar Man (3 episodes, 1977)
 Kingston: Confidential as Beth Kelly (13 episodes, 1977)
 Kingston (1976) (TV) as Beth Kelly
 Marcus Welby, M.D. as Janet Blake (Riley) / (24 episodes, 1975–1976)
 Rollerball (1975) as Mackie
 Doc Savage: The Man of Bronze (1975) as Mona
 Death Among Friends (1975) (TV) as Connie Benson
 The Rockford Files as Jennifer Ryburn (1 episode, 1975)
 The Specialists (1975) (TV)
 The Law (1974) (TV) as Cindy Best
 Ironside (1 episode, 1974)
 Lucas Tanner as Dee Wiggins (1 episode, 1974)
 McMillan & Wife as Gwynneth Jerome (1 episode, 1974)
 Owen Marshall: Counselor at Law as Miss Lathan (1 episode, 1974)
 Toma (1 episode, 1974)
 Chase (1 episode, 1974)
 Adam-12 as Nurse (1 episode, 1974)
 Kojak: Death is Not a Passing Grade as Delta, (1974)
 Emergency! as Wanda (1 episode, 1974)
 Banacek as Mandy (1 episode, 1974)
 The New Treasure Hunt (1973) TV series as Model (1973–1974)
 Griff as June (episode "Isolate and Destroy", 1973)
 Self-Portrait (1973)
 Making It (1971) as Bargirl
 There Was a Crooked Man... (1970) as Edwina

References

External links 
 
 
 

1950 births
20th-century American actresses
Actresses from California
American film actresses
American television actresses
Game show models
Living people
Actresses from Glendale, California
Jewish American actresses
Jewish American writers
21st-century American Jews
21st-century American women